Víctor Mora may refer to:

 Víctor Mora (comics) (1931–2016), Spanish writer of comic books
 Víctor Mora (athlete) (born 1944), retired long-distance runner from Colombia
 Víctor Hugo Mora (born 1974), Mexican football manager